Forty Mountain is a mountain located in the Town of Ohio in Herkimer County, New York. The Forty Mountain Trail is a hiking trail that leads to Forty Mountain. North Branch Little Black Creek flows to the south of Forty Mountain.

References

Mountains of Herkimer County, New York
Mountains of New York (state)